Irakia is a monotypic snout moth genus described by Hans Georg Amsel in 1955. Its only species, Irakia simplicialis, described by Walter Rothschild in 1921, is found in Iraq.

References

Phycitinae
Monotypic moth genera
Moths of Asia
Pyralidae genera
Taxa named by Hans Georg Amsel
Taxa named by Walter Rothschild